Matthew or Matt Howard may refer to:

 Matthew Munsel Howard (1794–1879), miller, farmer and political figure in Upper Canada
 Douglas Heyes (1919–1993), American film and television writer, sometimes credited under the pseudonym Matthew Howard
 Matthew O. Howard (1956–2018), professor for human services policy information
 Matthew Howard III (born 1959), American neurosurgeon, electrophysiologist, and inventor
 Matt Howard (baseball) (born 1967) American Major League Baseball second baseman
 Matthew Howard (footballer) (born 1970), English football defender
 Matt Howard (born 1989), American professional basketball player

See also 
 Matthew Howard-Gibbon (1796–1873), British officer